Bernard Baudoux (born 31 May 1928) is a French fencer. He won a silver medal in the team foil event at the 1956 Summer Olympics.

References

External links
 

1928 births
Living people
French male foil fencers
Olympic fencers of France
Fencers at the 1956 Summer Olympics
Olympic silver medalists for France
Olympic medalists in fencing
Medalists at the 1956 Summer Olympics
20th-century French people